Beautiful Ballads & Love Songs is Barry Manilow's 38th album release, a compilation album featuring his greatest ballads and love songs.

Track listing
 "Could It Be Magic"
 "My Baby Loves Me"
 "Weekend In New England"
 "Somewhere In The Night"
 "I Don't Want To Walk Without You"
 "No Other Love"
 "Stardust"
 "Where Or When"
 "The Best Of Me"
 "I Should Care"
 "Angel Eyes"
 "Unchained Melody"
 "Can't Take My Eyes Off You"
 "If"

References

2008 compilation albums
Barry Manilow compilation albums
albums produced by Walter Afanasieff
albums produced by Phil Ramone
albums produced by Clive Davis
albums produced by Ron Dante